Kojarena is a locality in the Mid West region of Western Australia.

The Australian Defence Satellite Communications Station, part of ECHELON, is located in Kojarena.

References

Mid West (Western Australia)
Towns in Western Australia